Salt water aspiration syndrome is a rare diving disorder suffered by scuba divers who inhale a mist of seawater from a faulty demand valve causing irritation of the lungs. It is not the same thing as aspiration of salt water as a bulk liquid, i.e. drowning. It can usually be treated by rest for several hours. If severe, medical assessment is required. First described by Carl Edmonds.

Signs and symptoms 
Symptoms of salt water aspiration syndrome include:
Post-dive cough, with or without sputum, usually suppressed during the dive.
In serious cases the sputum may be bloodstained, frothy and copious.
Over time further symptoms may develop, including:
rigors, tremors or shivering;
nausea or vomiting;
hot or cold sensations;
dyspnea; cough; sputum; shortness of breath;
headaches; malaise; and generalised aches.
 Cyanosis
 Mild fever
 retrosternal chest pain.

Diagnosis
The condition follows an exposure to breathing through apparatus that could allow aspiration of small quantities of salt water as an aerosol. An immediate cough with sputum followed by a latent period of about two hours average, respiratory symptoms and signs, reduction in forced expiration volume and vital capacity, possible radiographic changes and generalised symptoms of malaise, rigors, generalised aches and headaches, tachypnea and tachycardia.

Differential diagnosis should consider decompression sickness, which can be indicated by the dive profile and breathing gas mixtures, and the presence of other symptoms of decompression sickness. Treatment for DCS is appropriate if any of these indications exist.

A rapid beneficial response to breathing 100% oxygen is likely in the salt water aspiration syndrome, response to normobaric oxygen is likely to be slower for DCS, which may respond rapidly to recompression.

Pulmonary barotrauma is also possible and should be considered. Serious cases of pulmonary barotrauma with pneumothorax, air emboli and surgical emphysema occurring suddenly after a dive, are indicative of barotrauma, and may require recompression. Milder cases of pulmonary barotrauma may be confused with salt water aspiration syndrome, and treatment for barotrauma takes precedence until it can be eliminated by further tests.

The effects of cold and immersion are usually most pronounced immediately after leaving the water and tend to resolve on rewarming, and the clinical features are not very likely to be confused with salt water aspiration unless both conditions exist.

Causes
Possible mechanisms include:
a mild form of near drowning, 
a reaction to the inhalation of irritants or micro-organisms, 
occult nebulisation of salt water.

Treatment
Treatment would be similar to that for mild cases of near-drowning. Many cases are not sufficiently severe for the person to seek medical care and resolve spontaneously within a few hours.

When severe cough or bronchospasm occur assistance may be required. When symptoms are mild and oxygen saturation is normal, observation for 24 hours may be sufficient.

Intensive care may be indicated for severe respiratory distress, with chest X-rays, auscultation analysis of blood gases, electrolytes and urinary outpu, and continuous monitoring of oxygen saturation. Pulmonary oedema may develop over several hours.

Bronchospasm can be treated with inhaled beta agonists (bronchial dilators). In the rare cases where ARDS develops. continuous positive airway pressure, and possibly mechanical ventilation, may be necessary for adequate oxygen saturation.

Complications
As salt water is hypertonic it can cause a shift of fluid from the circulation into the lung and pleural space, which might explain the productive cough, and may cause hemoconcentration. Contaminated water can cause pneumonia and lung abscess.

Prevention
Some regulators tend to produce more atomised water in unusual positions, This is often due to water being trapped where it does not easily reach the exhaust valve. Returning to a position where the exhaust valve works properly can drain this water. A worn or poorly seating exhaust valve can let water in. This seal can be tested before diving by sucking on the regulator with the air supply turned off, which is one of the standard pre-dive checks, but often omitted. If the regulator is removed from the mouth in the water for any reason, it should be thoroughly purged by forceful when returned. Placing the tongue in the direct path of airflow into the mouth will defect the airflow around the sides. Water particles impinging on the tongue will tend to be stopped and build up in the saliva rather than being inhaled. Maintaining a proper seal on the mouthpiece with the lips can prevent leakage around the outside.

Outcomes
In most cases a full recovery can be expected over a few days

Epidemiology

See also

References

External links
 Diving Medicine Online — Salt Water Aspiration Syndrome

Diving medicine
Rare syndromes